Alessandra, Princess of Bismarck (née Silvestri-Lévy, born November 1, 1972, in São Paulo) is an Italo-Brazilian art writer and curator. As the wife of Carl-Eduard von Bismarck, she became the Princess of Bismarck in 2019.

A patron of the arts, she has produced and curated several exhibitions of photography, contemporary art, literature, and film festivals, mainly in Paris, São Paulo, and Havana.  She was the International Executive Director for the Brazilian Cinema Foundation (Cinemateca Brasileira).

Publications
2002: Cuba por Korda (with Christophe Lovigny). - Cosac Naify-Brasil, Ocean Press-USA, Calmann-Levy-France, Kuntersman-Germany, Ediciones Aurelia, Spain.
2002: Les Années Révolutionnaires - Éditions de l´Aube France.
2007: Cuba Sempre - Caros Amigos.
2007: Che Guevara Combatente e Intelectual - Casa Amarela.

References

External links 
 Korda

Brazilian curators
Brazilian art historians
Brazilian biographers
Brazilian people of Italian descent
Living people
Brazilian human rights activists
1972 births
Women art historians
Writers from São Paulo
Brazilian women writers
Women biographers